German submarine U-295 was a Type VIIC/41 U-boat of Nazi Germany's Kriegsmarine during World War II.

She was laid down on 31 December 1942 by the Bremer Vulkan Werft (yard) at Bremen-Vegesack as yard number 60, launched on 13 September 1943 and commissioned on 20 October with Kapitänleutnant Günther Wieboldt in command.

In six patrols, she damaged one warship.

She surrendered at Loch Eriboll in Scotland on 9 May 1945 and was sunk as part of Operation Deadlight on 17 December 1945.

Design
German Type VIIC/41 submarines were preceded by the shorter Type VIIB submarines. U-295 had a displacement of  when at the surface and  while submerged. She had two shafts and two  propellers.

U-295 was fitted with five  torpedo tubes (four fitted at the bow and one at the stern), fourteen torpedoes, one  SK C/35 naval gun, (220 rounds), one  Flak M42 and two  C/30 anti-aircraft guns. The boat had a complement of between forty-four and sixty.

Service history

The boat's service life began with training with the 8th U-boat Flotilla in October 1943. She was then transferred to the 9th flotilla for operations on 1 August 1944. She was reassigned to the 13th flotilla on 1 October and moved again to the 14th flotilla on 1 April 1945.

First and second patrols
U-295s first patrol was uneventful.

She then embarked on a series of short journeys between Bergen, Kristiansand, Stavanger and Trondheim.

Her second foray, between Trondheim and Harstad was the most successful.

Third and fourth patrols
The submarine's third sortie took her into the Barents and Norwegian Seas. She returned to Harstad on 18 December 1944.

Her fourth patrol started in Harstad and finished in Narvik. She had spent three days off Murmansk, to no avail.

Fifth patrol
Her fifth effort was just as barren, even though it was longer.

Sixth patrol and fate
The boat departed Narvik on 15 April 1945. Her route took her once again to the Barents Sea. She returned to the Nordic port on 7 May.

She was then moved to Skjomenfjord on 12 May 1945 and in accordance with the surrender terms, she was transferred to Loch Eriboll in northern Scotland for Operation Deadlight on the 19th.

Summary of raiding history

See also
 Battle of the Atlantic (1939-1945)

References

Notes

Citations

Bibliography

External links

German Type VIIC/41 submarines
U-boats commissioned in 1943
1943 ships
World War II submarines of Germany
Ships built in Bremen (state)
Operation Deadlight
U-boats sunk in 1945
U-boats sunk by Polish warships
Maritime incidents in December 1945